Downsville Bridge is a wooden covered bridge over the East Branch of the Delaware River in the hamlet of Downsville in Delaware County, New York. Designed by Scottish immigrant Robert Murray, the bridge was built in 1854, and is a single span, timber and plan framed bridge.

The bridge was listed on the National Register of Historic Places in 1999.

See also
List of bridges on the National Register of Historic Places in New York
List of covered bridges in New York
National Register of Historic Places listings in Delaware County, New York

References

External links

 Downsville Bridge, at New York State Covered Bridge Society
 Downsville Bridge, at Covered Bridges of the Northeast USA, a website developed by Hank Brickel

Covered bridges on the National Register of Historic Places in New York (state)
National Register of Historic Places in Delaware County, New York
Bridges completed in 1854
Wooden bridges in New York (state)
Bridges in Delaware County, New York
Tourist attractions in Delaware County, New York
Road bridges on the National Register of Historic Places in New York (state)
1854 establishments in New York (state)